Alfred Larsen may refer to:
 Alfred Larsen (sailor), Norwegian businessman and sailor
 Alfred Larsen (wrestler), Norwegian sport wrestler

See also
 Alfred Sinding-Larsen, Norwegian civil servant, journalist and writer
 Alf Larsen, Norwegian poet, essayist and magazine editor